Omang Reloaded is the fourth studio album of South African hip hop artist Hip Hop Pantsula, released under the CCP/EMI S.A. label in 2004 in South Africa.

Track listing

External links 

2004 albums
Hip Hop Pantsula albums